The Hong Kong Geographical Association exists to promote interest in, stimulate the teaching of, and research in Geography.

The association publishes the Hong Kong Geographer and also organizes various conferences, talks, and workshops regularly. In the year 2012–2013, it had more than 300 members.

Leadership 

The current chairperson of the executive committee is Dr. Nga Yee Irene Cheng, from the Science and Environmental Studies Department of the Education University of Hong Kong.

The immediate past chairman is Prof. Jiang Xu, from the Department of Geography and Resource Management, the Chinese University of Hong Kong.

External links
HKGA's Official Website

Geography of Hong Kong
Education in Hong Kong
Geographic societies